Mousa Madkhali  (born 19 December 1987) is a Saudi Arabian professional footballer who currently plays for Hetten as a striker.

Honours
Al-Wehda
Prince Mohammad bin Salman League: 2017–18

References

External links 
 

1987 births
Living people
Saudi Arabian footballers
Hetten FC players
Al-Wehda Club (Mecca) players
Al-Ain FC (Saudi Arabia) players
Al-Adalah FC players
Al-Entesar Club players
Saudi First Division League players
Saudi Professional League players
Saudi Second Division players
Association football forwards